Dance, Dance, Dance & Other Hits is a compilation album by American R&B band Chic, released by Rhino Records/Warner Music in 1997. The album is a re-release of 1995's Everybody Dance with the tracks in re-arranged order and new artwork.

Track listing
All tracks written by Bernard Edwards and Nile Rodgers unless otherwise noted.
"Le Freak"  - 5:31
 From 1978 album C'est Chic
"Rebels Are We" (7" Edit)  -  3:20
 Original version appears on 1980 album Real People    
"Soup for One" (7" Edit)  - 3:07
 Original version appears 1982 soundtrack album Soup For One
"Everybody Dance"  - 6:40
 From 1977 album Chic         
"Dance, Dance, Dance (Yowsah, Yowsah, Yowsah)" (Edwards, Lehman, Rodgers) - 8:22
 From 1977 album Chic 
"Good Times"  - 8:13
 From 1979 album Risqué   
"My Forbidden Lover"  - 4:42
 From 1979 album Risqué   
"Real People" (7" Edit)  - 3:46
 Original version appears on 1980 album Real People
"Chip off the Old Block"  - 5:00
 From 1980 album Real People    
"I Want Your Love"  - 6:55
 From 1978 album C'est Chic

Production
 Bernard Edwards - producer for Chic Organization Ltd.
 Nile Rodgers - producer for Chic Organization Ltd.

Chic (band) compilation albums
Albums produced by Nile Rodgers
Albums produced by Bernard Edwards
1997 compilation albums
Rhino Records compilation albums